The Icelandic Floorball Committee is the governing body of floorball in the country of Iceland. It was formed in 2005. As of January 1, 2010 there were four teams competing in a league; three of those teams came from officially registered clubs: Bandýmannafélagið Viktor (est. 2004), Bandýfélag Kópavogs (est. 2006) and Bandýfélag Reykjavíkur (est. 2009).

Sources
Icelandic Registry of Companies
Homepage of Bandýfélag Kópavogs

National members of the International Floorball Federation
Floorball
Floorball in Iceland
Floorball governing bodies
2005 establishments in Iceland